Yevgeni Mikhailovich Skachkov (born 23 December 1978 in Anapa) is a former Russian football player.

References

1978 births
Living people
Russian footballers
Russian expatriate footballers
Expatriate footballers in Ukraine
FC Chernomorets Novorossiysk players
Russian Premier League players
FC Tyumen players
PFC Spartak Nalchik players
FC Sodovik Sterlitamak players
FC Spartak-UGP Anapa players
FC Slavyansk Slavyansk-na-Kubani players
FC Kristall Smolensk players
Association football midfielders
FC Chita players
FC Volga Ulyanovsk players
FC Amur Blagoveshchensk players
People from Anapa
Sportspeople from Krasnodar Krai